The 2020–21 California United Strikers FC season was the club's second in the National Independent Soccer Association (NISA) and second as a professional team overall.

Roster

Players

Staff
  Don Ebert – Head coach
  Roy Chingirian – Assistant coach
  Willie Diaz – Assistant coach

Transfers

In

Out

Friendlies

Competitions

NISA Fall Season 

On June 4, NISA announced details for the 2020 Fall Season. The eight member teams would be split into conferences, Eastern and Western, with the Strikers playing in the later. The team is set to play two regular season games, one home and one away, against the rest of the Western Conference.

The Fall regular season schedule was announced on July 31, 2020.

Standings

Results summary

Matches

Fall Playoffs

All eight NISA teams qualified for the 2020 Fall tournament, which will be hosted at Keyworth Stadium in Detroit, Michigan, beginning on September 21 ending with the final on October 2.

Group stage

NISA Spring Season

NISA Legends Cup 
NISA announced initial spring season plans in early February 2021, including starting the season with a tournament in Chattanooga, Tennessee with a standard regular season to follow. The tournament, now called the NISA Legends Cup, was officially announced on March 10 and is scheduled to run between April 13 and 25. All nine NISA members teams taking part in the Spring were divided into three team groups and played a round robin schedule. The highest placing group winner automatically qualified for the tournament final, while the second and third highest finishing teams overall played one-another in a semifinal to determine a second finalist.

The Strikers were drawn into Group 2 alongside Detroit City FC and the returning Stumptown AC.

Standings

Group 2 results

Group stage

Regular season 
The Spring Season schedule was announced on March 18 with each association member playing eight games, four home and four away, in a single round-robin format.

Standings

Results summary

Matches

U.S. Open Cup 

As a team playing in a recognized professional league, the Strikers would normally be automatically qualified for the U.S. Open Cup. However, with the 2021 edition shorted due to the COVID-19 pandemic, NISA has only been allotted 1 to 2 teams spots. On March 29, U.S. Soccer announced 2020 Fall Champion Detroit City FC as NISA's representative in the tournament.

Squad statistics

Appearances and goals 

|-
! colspan="14" style="background:#dcdcdc; text-align:center"| Goalkeepers

|-
! colspan="14" style="background:#dcdcdc; text-align:center"| Defenders

|-
! colspan="14" style="background:#dcdcdc; text-align:center"| Midfielders

|-
! colspan="14" style="background:#dcdcdc; text-align:center"| Forwards

|-
! colspan="14" style="background:#dcdcdc; text-align:center"| Left during season

|-
|}

Goal scorers

Disciplinary record

Notes

References

External links 

 

California United Strikers FC seasons
California United Strikers
California United Strikers
California United Strikers
California United Strikers